Kasserer Jensen (Jensen the Cashier) is a Norwegian comedy film from 1954. It was directed by Nils R. Müller. The script was written by Hans Christensen and Carlo M. Pedersen.

Plot
A confusing comedy results from mistaken identity between the cashier Theodor Jensen and an escaped criminal, Gerhardt Müller, both played by Carsten Winger. Nanna Stenersen plays the role of Mrs. Jensen.

Reception
On Friday, October 29, 1954, the newspaper Verdens Gang praised the acting and direction, but it also wrote: "It is again the script that has failed. The writer did not have enough ideas to fill the film with content. The result is many stagnant scenes and many unnecessary repetitions. Therefore the viewer often loses interest along the way." Verdens Gang rated the film a 3 out of 6.

Cast
 Carsten Winger as Theodor Jensen / Gerhardt Müller
 Nanna Stenersen as Mrs. Jensen
 Einar Sissener as Director Simonsen
 Espen Skjønberg as Svensen
 Liv Wilse as Miss Andersen
 Aud Schønemann as Miss Stjernholm
 Harald Aimarsen as Jensen's coworker
 Rolf Christensen as the prosecutor
 Ulf Selmer as the judge
 Arne Bang-Hansen as a ferryman
 Jørn Ording as an attorney
 Marius Eriksen Jr. as a journalist
 Øivind Johnssen as a guard

References

External links
 
 Kasserer Jensen at the National Library of Norway
 Kasserer Jensen at Filmfront

1954 films
Norwegian comedy films
Norwegian black-and-white films
Films directed by Nils R. Müller
1954 comedy films